Eastern Cape is one of the nine multi-member constituencies of the National Assembly of South Africa, the lower house of the Parliament of South Africa, the national legislature of South Africa. The constituency was established in 1994 when the National Assembly was established by the Interim Constitution following the end of Apartheid. It is conterminous with the province of Eastern Cape. The constituency currently elects 25 of the 400 members of the National Assembly using the closed party-list proportional representation electoral system. At the 2019 general election it had 3,363,161 registered electors.

Electoral system
Eastern Cape currently elects 25 of the 400 members of the National Assembly using the closed party-list proportional representation electoral system. Constituency seats are allocated using the largest remainder method with a Droop quota.

Election results

Summary

Detailed

2019
Results of the 2019 general election held on 8 May 2019:

The following candidates were elected:
Ndumiso Capa (ANC), Mary-Ann Dunjwa (ANC), Pumza Dyantyi (ANC), Zukisa Cheryl Faku (ANC), Cedric Frolick (ANC), Lennox Bogen Gaehler (UDM), Nqabisa Gantsho (ANC), Samantha Graham (DA), Chantel King (DA), Tozama Mantashe (ANC), Nthako Matiase (EFF), Veronica Mente (EFF), Zola Mlenzana (ANC), Gordon Gcinikhaya Mpumza (ANC), Nonkosi Queenie Mvana (ANC), Baxolile Nodada (DA), Mncedisi Nontsele (ANC), Xola Nqola (ANC), Nolitha Ntobongwana (ANC), Zamuxolo Peter (ANC), Sakhumzi Stoffels Somyo (ANC), Annette Steyn (DA), Nokuzola Gladys Tolashe (ANC), Busisiwe Tshwete (ANC) and Sheilla Tembalam Xego (ANC).

2014
Results of the 2014 general election held on 7 May 2014:

The following candidates were elected:
Nqaba Bhanga (DA), Fezile Bhengu (ANC), Ndumiso Capa (ANC), Yusuf Cassim (DA), Mary-Ann Dunjwa (ANC), Zukisa Cheryl Faku (ANC), Malcolm John Figg (DA), Mncedisi Filtane (UDM), Cedric Frolick (ANC), Lennox Bogen Gaehler (UDM), Mcebisi Jonas (ANC), Tandiwe Elizabeth Kenye (ANC), Fezeka Sister Loliwe (ANC), Annette Lovemore (DA), Zukile Luyenge (ANC), Hope Helene Malgas (ANC), Tozama Mantashe (ANC), Asanda Matshobeni (EFF), Comely Humphrey Maqocwa Maxegwana (ANC), Pumzile Justice Mnguni (ANC), Stella Ndabeni-Abrahams (ANC), Nokuzola Ndongeni (ANC), Bonisile Alfred Nesi (ANC), Imamile Aubin Pikinini (ANC), Daphne Zukiswa Rantho (ANC) and Sheilla Tembalam Xego-Sovita (ANC).

2009
Results of the 2009 general election held on 22 April 2009:

The following candidates were elected:
Mary-Ann Dunjwa (ANC), Nkosinathi Benson Fihla (ANC), Cedric Frolick (ANC), Lennox Bogen Gaehler (UDM), Nonkululeko Prudence Gcume (COPE), Monwabisi Bevan Goqwana (ANC), Tandiwe Elizabeth Kenye (ANC), Donald Lee (DA), Annette Lovemore (DA), Zukile Luyenge (ANC), Hope Helene Malgas (ANC), Zwelivelile Mandlesizwe Dalibhunga Mandela (ANC), Joel Mntwabantu Matshoba (ANC), Nomakhaya Mavis Mdaka (ANC), Vatiswa Mugwanya (ANC), Stella Ndabeni (ANC), Mlindi Advent Nhanha (COPE), Makhosazana Abigail Alicia Njobe (COPE), Gugile Ernest Nkwinti (ANC), Stone Sizani (ANC), Grant Trevor Snell (ANC), Litho Suka (ANC), Athol Trollip (DA), Pam Tshwete (ANC), Ntombikayise Margaret Twala (ANC) and Tokozile Xasa (ANC).

2004
Results of the 2004 general election held on 14 April 2004:

The following candidates were elected:
Fezile Bhengu (ANC), Jackson Bici (UDM), Ntombazana Gertrude Winifred Botha (ANC), Judy Chalmers (ANC), Geoff Doidge (ANC), Stuart Farrow (DA), Nkosinathi Benson Fihla (ANC), Cedric Frolick (ANC), Mluleki George (ANC), Mbulelo Terence Goniwe (ANC), Pumzile John Gomomo (ANC), Lindiwe Hendricks (ANC), Patekile Holomisa (ANC), Mlungisi Johnson (ANC), Zamiwonga James Kati (ANC), Ncumisa Chwayita Kondlo (ANC), Cikizwa Ivy Ludwabe (ANC), Nomhle Maria Mahlawe (ANC), Mziwandile McDonald Masala (ANC), Shepherd Malusi Mayatula (ANC), Nomakhaya Mavis Mdaka (UDM), Makhosazana Abigail Alicia Njobe (ANC), Robert Zamxolo Nogumla (ANC), Emanuel Andreas Schoeman (ANC), Sylvia Nomatamsanqa Sigcau (UDM), Buyelwa Sonjica (ANC), Edward William Trent (DA) and Pam Tshwete (ANC).

1999
Results of the 1999 general election held on 2 June 1999:

1994
Results of the 1994 general election held on between 26 and 29 April 1994:

References

National Assembly constituency
National Assembly of South Africa constituencies
National Assembly of South Africa constituencies established in 1994